The  was an incident that took place in Tokyo, Japan on July 15, 1949, when an unmanned 63 series train with its operating handle tied down drove into Mitaka Station on the Chūō Line, killing six people and injuring 20. The incident remains a mystery, as do the Shimoyama and Matsukawa incidents which occurred around the same time.

The government indicted ten people on a charge of train sabotage resulting in death of the victims, as well as the train's conductor, Keisuke Takeuchi, who was not in the train when it derailed.

History
On the day of the derailment, all four of the police officers at Mitaka Station abandoned their posts; this was never explained. Two of the alleged conspirators were indicted for perjury. Takeuchi's lawyer refused to allow a co-worker to present evidence affirming that he and Takeuchi were in a public bath together when the train left the station (an apparently airtight proof that at least one other person was involved), claiming it was "irrelevant to the case".

In a court ruling in 1955, the judge found there was no evidence of a conspiracy, but rather that Takeuchi had planned and executed the entire incident himself. Takeuchi was sentenced to death; the other defendants were declared innocent of all charges. All appeals of the verdict were rejected. All the acquitted defendants were members of the Japanese Communist Party, but Takeuchi was not. Takeuchi died in jail in 1967 of a brain tumour. Until his death, he continued to proclaim his innocence while in prison for life.

In 2010, an article from the Japan Times mentioned that the confession Takeuchi provided was done under duress from the police. 

In 2019, the Tokyo High Court denied a request to have a retrial for Keisuke Takeuchi. His son, Kenichiro, mentioned that he was disappointed at the decision.

See also
List of rail accidents (1930–49)

References

History of Tokyo
Derailments in Japan
Railway accidents in 1949
Mass murder in 1949
1949 in Japan
Chūō Main Line
Rail transport in Tokyo
Accidents and incidents involving Japanese National Railways
July 1949 events in Asia
Mass murder in Japan
1949 murders in Japan
1949 in Tokyo